Chit San Maung (born 25 January 1988) is a footballer from Burma who plays as a defender for Ayeyawady United.

On 31 May 2010 in a 2010 AFC President's Cup game against FC HTTU, Chit was sent off in the 29th minute in an eventual 0-0 draw in which HTTU's Arslanmyrat Amanow was also sent off.

In the 2015 AFC Cup group stage, Chit conceded a first half penalty and was sent off in the second half against Lao Toyota F.C., although Ayeyawady won the match 4-3.

He retired in December 2015.

References

1988 births
Living people
Burmese footballers
Sportspeople from Yangon
Yadanarbon F.C. players
Ayeyawady United F.C. players
Association football fullbacks